Adolf von Rauch (22 April 1798 - 12 December 1882) was a German paper manufacturer in Heilbronn, where he was born and died and where he was a major builder of social housing.

Papermakers
1798 births
1882 deaths
People from Heilbronn